Save the World may refer to:

Music
Save the World (Geordie album), 1976
Save the World (Yolanda Adams album), 1993
"Save the World" (George Harrison song), 1981
"Save the World" (Swedish House Mafia song), 2011
"Save the World", a song by Adelitas Way from Stuck, 2014
"Save the World", a song by Blaxy Girls, 2010
"Save the World", a song by Bon Jovi from Crush, 2000
"SAVE the World", a track from the soundtrack of the 2015 video game Undertale by Toby Fox
Save the World Reunion Tour, a 2019 concert tour by Swedish House Mafia

Video games 
Fortnite: Save the World, a video game

See also